Donnell Young (April 25, 1888 – July 28, 1989) was an American sprinter. He competed in the men's 200 metres at the 1912 Summer Olympics.

See also
 List of centenarians (sportspeople)

References

1888 births
1989 deaths
Athletes (track and field) at the 1912 Summer Olympics
American centenarians
American male sprinters
Olympic track and field athletes of the United States
People from Hanover, Massachusetts
Sportspeople from Plymouth County, Massachusetts
Track and field athletes from Massachusetts
Men centenarians